The Chinatown East Gate (also known as the Gate of Maternal Virtues) is installed in Los Angeles' Chinatown neighborhood, in the U.S. state of California.  The structure was installed in 1939, one year after the dedication of Central Plaza and the installation of the Chinatown West Gate. It was commissioned by Y.C. Hong to commemorate his mother. The East Gate has been designated a Los Angeles Historic-Cultural Monument, No. 826.

See also
 History of Chinese Americans in Los Angeles
 List of Los Angeles Historic-Cultural Monuments in Downtown Los Angeles

References

External links
 

1939 establishments in California
Buildings and structures in Los Angeles
Chinatown, Los Angeles
Gates in the United States
Outdoor sculptures in Greater Los Angeles